The Territory of Papua and New Guinea, officially the Administrative Union of the Territory of Papua and the Territory of New Guinea, was established by an administrative union between the Australian-administered territories of Papua and New Guinea (the latter being a United Nations trust territory administered by Australia) in 1949. In December 1971, the name of the Territory changed to "Papua New Guinea" and in 1975 it became the Independent State of Papua New Guinea.

Background

Ancient history

Archeological evidence suggests that humans arrived on New Guinea around 50,000 years ago. These Melanesian people developed stone tools and agriculture. Portuguese and Spanish navigators sailing in the South Pacific entered New Guinea waters in the early part of the 16th century and in 1526–27, Jorge de Menezes came upon the principal island "Papua". In 1545, the Spaniard Iñigo Ortiz de Retes gave the island the name "New Guinea" because of what he saw as a resemblance between the islands' inhabitants and those found on the African Guinea coast. Knowledge of the interior of the island remained scant for several centuries after these initial European encounters.

Colonisation and World Wars

In 1884, Germany formally took possession of the northeast quarter of the island and it became known as German New Guinea. In 1884, a British protectorate was proclaimed over Papua – the southern coast of New Guinea. The protectorate, called British New Guinea, was annexed outright on 4 September 1888 and possession passed to the newly federated Commonwealth of Australia in 1902 and British New Guinea became the Australian Territory of Papua, with Australian administration beginning in 1906.

The Australian Naval and Military Expeditionary Force seized German New Guinea and the neighbouring islands of the Bismarck Archipelago for the Allies in 1914, during the early stages of the First World War. At the 1919 Paris Peace Conference following the war, Australian Prime Minister Billy Hughes sought to secure possession of New Guinea from the defeated German Empire: telling the Conference: "Strategically the northern islands (such as New Guinea) encompass Australia like fortresses. They are as necessary to Australia as water to a city." Article 22 of the Treaty of Versailles provided for the division of Germany and the Central Powers' imperial possessions among the victorious Allies of World War I and German New Guinea, the Bismarck Archipelago and Nauru were assigned to Australia as League of Nations Mandates: territories "formerly governed [by the Central Powers] and which are inhabited by peoples not yet able to stand by themselves under the strenuous conditions of the modern world".

Shortly after the start of the Pacific War, the island of New Guinea was invaded by the Japanese. Most of West Papua, at that time known as Dutch New Guinea, was occupied, as were large parts of the Territory of New Guinea. The New Guinea campaign was a major campaign of the Pacific War. In all, some 200,000 Japanese soldiers, sailors and airmen died during the campaign against approximately 7,000 Australian and 7,000 American service personnel. Major battles included the Battle of Kokoda Trail, Battle of Buna-Gona and Battle of Milne Bay. The offensives in Papua and New Guinea of 1943–44 were the single largest series of connected operations ever mounted by the Australian armed forces. Bitter fighting continued in New Guinea between the Allies and the Japanese 18th Army based in New Guinea until the Japanese surrender in 1945.

Establishment of the Territory of Papua and New Guinea

Following the Surrender of Japan in 1945, civil administration of Papua and New Guinea was restored, and under the Papua New Guinea Provisional Administration Act (1945–46), Papua and New Guinea were combined in an administrative union. The Papua and New Guinea Act 1949 united, for administrative purposes only, the Territory of Papua and the Territory of New Guinea as the Territory of Papua and New Guinea. The Act formally approved the placing of New Guinea under the international trusteeship system and confirmed the administrative union of New Guinea and Papua under the title of The Territory of Papua and New Guinea. It also provided for a Legislative Council (which was established in 1951), a judicial organization, a public service, and a system of local government. The House of Assembly replaced the Legislative Council in 1963, and the first House of Assembly of Papua and New Guinea opened on 8 June 1964.

In 1963, the population was approximately two million, of which about 25,000 were non-indigenous. The economy was based on cash crops including coffee, cocoa, and copra as well as timber mills, wharves and factories. Difficult terrain rendered communication between districts difficult and there was a lack of national unity in the territory.

One of the ways in which the territory was administered was through the use of patrol officers. Between 1949 and 1974, more than 2000 Australians served as patrol officers, known locally as "kiaps". The job of patrol officers involved: facilitating the consolidation of administrative influence, maintaining the rule of law, conducting court cases and presiding as Magistrate, carrying out police work, conducting censuses, encouraging economic development, providing escorts, purchasing land for governmental use and overseeing local elections.

Towards independence

On 13 December 1971 the name of the territory was changed to Papua New Guinea. Under Australian Minister for External Territories Andrew Peacock, the territory adopted self-government in 1972. 1972 elections saw the formation of a ministry headed by Chief Minister Michael Somare, who pledged to lead PNG to self-government and then to independence. Following the passage of the Papua New Guinea Independence Act 1975, during the term of the Whitlam Government in Australia, the Territory became the Independent State of Papua New Guinea and attained independence on 16 September 1975.

See also

History of Papua New Guinea
History of Nauru – the other League of Nations mandate and United Nations Trust Territory of Australia

References

Further reading

 
Australia and the Commonwealth of Nations
1975 disestablishments in Oceania
Proposed states and territories of Australia
States and territories established in 1949
20th century in Australia
1949 establishments in Papua New Guinea
1975 disestablishments in Papua New Guinea
Former colonies in Oceania
United Nations trust territories
20th-century disestablishments in Papua New Guinea
Papua New Guinea and the Commonwealth of Nations